Clibadium napoense is a species of flowering plant in the family Asteraceae.
It is found only in Ecuador.
Its natural habitat is subtropical or tropical moist lowland forests.
It is threatened by habitat loss.

References

napo
Endemic flora of Ecuador
Vulnerable flora of South America
Taxonomy articles created by Polbot